Raverats may refer to:

 Jacques Raverat and his wife Gwen Darwin
 Virginia Woolf and the Raverats the correspondence between the above couple and Virginia Woolf